The Saddletramps were an alternative country band from Toronto, Ontario in the 1980s and 1990s. Core members of the band included Ken Horne, Andrew Lindsay, John DeHaas and Brian Duguay.

History
In the early 1980s several Fanshawe College students from the Greater Toronto Area who shared a rented house in London, Ontario got together to form the band Tin Mitten. Their first gig was opening for another established local band, The Waiting. Friends of the band members chanted "No Waiting, Mitten Now" and pelted the band with mittens. The band was soon renamed The Saddletramps, and performed in various Toronto venues.  

Lindsay met seventeen-year-old Sarah Harmer while working at Sunrise Records in Burlington, and she joined the band, later commuting to Toronto to perform on weekends while attending Queen's University. 

In 1989 the Saddletramps released their first album, The Saddle Tramps, on cassette tape, with Dehaas on bass,  Duguay on lead guitar and vocals, Harmer on vocals, Horne on percussion, Lindsay on vocals and guitar.  Mike Northcott also contributed some instrumental work. The album was recorded at Grant Ave and Axon Studios, and all but one of the songs were written by the band members.

In 1990 the band released a second cassette album, Yardsale.  Harmer left to concentrate on her studies; she later fronted her own band, Weeping Tile.

The Saddletramps disbanded in 1995. 

In 1999, Harmer began a solo career; her solo album You Were Here included a new recording of "Don't Get Your Back Up", which she had originally recorded with The Saddletramps on Yardsale. Lindsay, Duguay, and Dehaas formed a new band called Loomer along with Michael Taylor, Iain Thomson, and Scott Loomer. The band released an album, Love Is A Dull Instrument in 2004. In 2006, Harmer sang "Only Lovers" on the band's second album, Songs of the Wild West Island.

Discography

Albums
The Saddle Tramps (1989) Tracks: "Christ", "Life and Times", "Church", "Winds of Change", "Alaska", "I Don't Mind", "Blue Eyes" and "Fallen Angel"
Yardsale (1990) Tracks: "Weight of the World", "Deal With It", "Boomerang", "4000 Roads",    "She Don't Love", "Rain of Gold", "Wastin' It On You", "Race Along The Edge", "Passin' Thru", "Don't Get Your Back Up"
Well Gone Bad (1993)

References

Canadian alternative country groups